Bao Xiaofeng (born November 22, 1979) is a Chinese news anchor for China Central Television, the main state announcer of China. She is of Mongol descent. She is known all over China as an announcer for the 7:00 pm CCTV News program Xinwen Lianbo, which has reach all over China on various networks and internationally, is one of the most watched news programs in the world.

Biography
Bao was born in Hohhot, Inner Mongolia, on November 22, 1979, while her ancestral home in Liaoning. She attended Xinhuajie School and Hohhot Experimental Middle School. She secondary studied at Hohhot Tumet High School. In 1997, she was admitted to the  Communication University of China, majoring in the Broadcasting Department. After graduating in 2001, she was recruited in the China Central Television (CCTV) and hosted several news programs such as Live News Room. On September 12, 2021, she hosted her first newscast on Xinwen Lianbo (or News Simulcast).

Television
 Asia Report
 News 8:00
 Media Plaza
 Morning News
 News 30'''
 Live News Midnight News Focus on Xinwen Lianbo (or News Simulcast'')

References

1979 births
Living people
People from Hohhot
Chinese people of Mongolian descent
Communication University of China alumni
CCTV newsreaders and journalists